Silent Partner is a 1944 American thriller film directed by George Blair and written by Dane Lussier and Gertrude Walker. Starring William "Bill" Henry, Beverly Lloyd, Grant Withers, Ray Walker, Joan Blair and Roland Drew, the film was released on June 9, 1944, by Republic Pictures.

Plot
Reporters investigating the death of a friend begin to suspect that their newspaper's editor might be responsible.

Cast  
 William "Bill" Henry as Jeffrey Swales
 Beverly Lloyd as Mary Price
 Grant Withers as Bob Ross
 Ray Walker as Reilly
 Joan Blair as Lady Sylvia Marlowe
 Roland Drew as Harry Keating
 George Meeker as R.S. Treavor
 Wally Vernon as Room Service Waiter
 John Harmon as Blackie Barton
 Dick Elliott as Pop
 Eddie Fields as Tony 
 Patricia Knox as Dolly Daring

References

External links 
 
 
 

1944 films
American thriller films
1940s thriller films
Republic Pictures films
Films directed by George Blair
American black-and-white films
1940s English-language films
1940s American films